This is a list of contestants who have appeared on The Amazing Race Canada, a Canadian reality game show based on the American series, The Amazing Race. A total of 162 contestants have appeared in the series.

Contestants

Gallery

References

External links

Amazing Race Canada contestants, The